Mińsk District was a district of the Civil Administration of the Eastern Lands from September 1919 to September 1920, and Provisional Administration of Front-line and Phase Territories from September 1920 to December 1920, all of which were under the control of the Second Polish Republic. Its seat was located in Minsk. In December 1919, it had an area of 35,947 km² (13,879 square miles), and was inhabited by 1 091 138 people.

It was established on 15 September 1919 from the lands conquered from the Socialist Soviet Republic of Lithuania and Belorussia by Poland. On 17 January 1920, it was incorporated into Provisional Administration of Front-line and Phase Territories. On 20 December 1920, the civil administration was disestablished and the district was divided between Nowogródek District, Second Polish Republic and Byelorussian SSR.

History 
It was established on 15 September 1919 with the formation of Civil Administration of the Lands of Volhynia and Podolian Front, from the lands conquered from the Socialist Soviet Republic of Lithuania and Belorussia. It was formed as a district of the civil administration under the control of Second Polish Republic, of the lands conquered by it during the Polish–Soviet War. Its seat was located in Minsk. The region was governed by the Chief of District.

It consisted of the counties of Bobrujsk, Borysów, Ihumeń, Mińsk and Słuck.

On 9 September 1920, the district was incorporated into, then formed, Provisional Administration of Front-line and Phase Territories. On the same day, from Lepelsky and Polotsky Uyezds was formed Lepel County. On 25 October 1920, city of Minsk was separated from Mińsk County forming a separate county. On 12 December 1920 was formed Stołpce County.

On 20 December 1920, the civil administration was disestablished and lands of the district were divided between Second Polish Republic and Byelorussian SSR, with Poland incorporating Stołpce County into Nowogródek District.

Demography 
In December 1919, the district was inhabited by 1,091,138 people, and had an area of 35,947 km² (13,879 square miles), having the population density of 30,4 people/km² (78.6 people/square mile). The biggest cities were: Minsk with 102 392 inhabitants, Babruysk with 29 704, and Slutsk with 14 162. The territory included 8,781 other settlements, from which 1 had population between 5 and 10 thousand people and 31, between 1 and 5 thousand. Out of the peoplulation 64.5% identified themselves as Belarusian, 14.6% as Polish, 11.3% as Jewish, 3.5% as Locals, 0.2% as Lithuanin and 5.9% as others, mainly Russians.

Education 
In the school year of 1919/1920, the district had 1123 primary schools, 71 middle schools and 14 vocational schools. To all schools had attended 84 690 students and had taught 2454 teachers. In March 1920, there were 279 schools that taught in Polish language and 1,208 that taught in others. Among the middle schools, there were 643 teachings in the Russian language with 42,541 students and 906 teachers, 262 in the Polish language with 13,106 students and 348 teachers, 194 in the Belarusian language with 10,417 students and 271 teachers, and 24 in Yiddish with 2,633 students and 99 teachers.

Subdivisions

City counties 
 Minsk (from 25 October 1920)

Land counties 
 Bobrujsk County
 Borysów County
 Ihumeń County
 Lepel County (from 9 September 1920)
 Mińsk County
 Słuck County
 Stołpce County (from 12 December 1920)

Notes

References 

States and territories established in 1919
States and territories disestablished in 1920
1919 establishments in Poland
1920 disestablishments in Poland
Districts of the civil administrations of the Second Polish Republic
Western Belorussia (1918–1939)